Samsung Digital Imaging (Korean: 삼성디지털이미징) is a Korean optoelectronics company.

It is one of the subsidiaries of Samsung Group, and it was spun off from Samsung Techwin's Optoelectronics part after February 2, 2009.

References 

Digital Imaging
Medical technology companies of South Korea